Swashbucklers: Blue vs. Grey is a 2007 Russian RPG video game developed by Russian company TM Studios with Akella and published by Atari /1C Company for Windows and PlayStation 2.

Reception 
Worthplaying felt the box cover art was more exciting than the game itself. Gamezone said the graphics looked three years old. Game Revolution was let down by the game's unimpressive presentation. Gamesradar felt the gameplay was repetitive. IGN felt it was simply not a good game. GameSpot thought it was an inferior copy of Sid Meier's Pirates.

The game has a Metacritic score of 45% based on 16 critic reviews.

References 

2007 video games
1C Company games
Action role-playing video games
Naval video games
PlayStation 2 games
Video games about pirates
Video games developed in Russia
Windows games
Akella games
Multiplayer and single-player video games